Soybean chlorotic mottle virus (SbCMV) is a plant pathogenic virus of the family Caulimoviridae, genus Soymovirus.

See also
 List of soybean diseases

References

External links
ICTVdB – The Universal Virus Database: Soybean chlorotic mottle virus
Family Groups – The Baltimore Method

Caulimoviridae
Viral plant pathogens and diseases
Soybean diseases